The 1964 Arkansas gubernatorial election was held on November 3, 1964.

Incumbent Democratic Governor Orval Faubus won election to a sixth term, defeating Republican nominee Winthrop Rockefeller with 57.00% of the vote.

Primary elections
Primary elections were held on July 28, 1964.

Democratic primary

Candidates
Ervin Odell Dorsey	
Orval Faubus, incumbent Governor
Joe Hubbard
R. D. Burrow, hardware store owner

Results

Republican primary

Candidates
Winthrop Rockefeller, businessman

Results

General election

Candidates
Orval Faubus, Democratic
Winthrop Rockefeller, Republican 
 Kenneth Hurst, Write-in, Service Station operator

Results

References

Bibliography
 
 

1964
Arkansas
Gubernatorial
November 1964 events in the United States